Rosaphula is a genus of flies in the family Stratiomyidae.

Species
Rosaphula handschini Frey, 1934

References

Stratiomyidae
Brachycera genera
Taxa named by Richard Karl Hjalmar Frey
Diptera of Asia